The Science Teaching Hub is a building at the University of Aberdeen.

History 
Plans for the building were revealed on 1 September 2017. Pending approval, teaching in the building was slated to begin in 2021.

Planning permission was granted in August 2018. Construction began in May 2019, two months later than expected. The building was completed in late 2021.

Location 
The building is situated within the university's Old Aberdeen campus on a site adjacent to the Sir Duncan Rice Library and the Fraser Noble Building.

Design 
The building was designed by Reiach and Hall Architects and is being built at a cost of £35 million. The building will contain laboratories for students studying various subjects.

References 

Buildings and structures in Aberdeen
Buildings and structures completed in 2021
University of Aberdeen